Fame is an unincorporated community located in Webster County, Mississippi, United States.

Fame had a school, and a post office from 1875 to 1909.  The Fame Church is still located there.

References

Unincorporated communities in Webster County, Mississippi
Unincorporated communities in Mississippi